The following lists events that happened during 1988 in the Union of Soviet Socialist Republics.

Incumbents
General Secretary of the Communist Party of the Soviet Union – Mikhail Gorbachev
Chairman of the Presidium of the Supreme Soviet – Andrei Gromyko (until 1 October, then Mikhail Gorbachev)
Premier of the Soviet Union – Nikolai Ryzhkov
Chairman of the Supreme Court of the Soviet Union – Vladimir Terebilov

Events

January
7 January – The decision by the Central Committee of the Communist Party of the Soviet Union, Presidium of the Supreme Soviet and the Council of Ministers of the Soviet Union to rename the city of Brezhnev to Naberezhnye Chelny is published. This was followed by the decision to remove the names of Leonid Brezhnev and Konstantin Chernenko from the names of all Soviet institutions, streets and inhabited places later that year.
16 January – The Presidium of the Supreme Soviet adopts a Decree on the Establishment of the State Committee for Nature Protection.
18 January – Aeroflot Flight 699 crashes on approach to Krasnovodsk Airport (now Turkmenbashi International Airport), killing eleven people.

February
12 February – American cruiser USS Yorktown and destroyer USS Caron enter Soviet territorial waters in the Black Sea, where they are bumped by the Soviet frigates Bezzavetny and SKR-6, respectively.
14 February – Fire breaks out in the Library of the USSR Academy of Sciences, destroying approximately 300,000 volumes. 3.5 million volumes become damp due to firefighting foam.
20 February – Council of People's Deputies of the Nagorno-Karabakh Autonomous Oblast (NKAO) declares the secession of the oblast from the Azerbaijan SSR, triggering the First Nagorno-Karabakh War.
22–23 February – Rallies in Baku and Sumgait under the slogan "NKAO is an integral part of Azerbaijan" take place.

March
8 March – Aeroflot Flight 3739 is hijacked en route from Irkutsk to Leningrad.
25 March – ASSA art rock event opens in Moscow.

April
5 April – Pravda publishes the article of Alexander Yakovlev "The Principles of Perestroika: The Revolutionism of Thought and Actions", which criticizes Joseph Stalin and supports perestroika.

May
29 May – U.S. President Ronald Reagan visits the Soviet Union. The Moscow Summit takes place. The Medium and Short-Range Missile Reduction Treaty is signed, including OTR-23 Oka as a "bonus for American partners".
31 May – President Reagan addresses 600 Moscow State University students.

June
3 June – The formation of Sąjūdis is announced in Vilnius.
5 June – The celebration of the 1000th anniversary of the Christianization of Rus' begins in the Yelokhovo Cathedral.
17 June – Moskovskiye Novosti publishes the information about Katyn massacre, demanding an investigation of the event.
28 June – The 19th Conference of CPSU opens in Moscow.

July
1 July – At the 19th All-Union Conference of the CPSU Yegor Ligachev utters his famous phrase "Boris, you are wrong".
12 July – The first Soviet beauty pageant is held. The winner becomes Mariya Kalinina. 
26 July – The Presidium of the Supreme Soviet posthumously restores Nikolay Kuznetsov in the rank of the Admiral of the Fleet of the Soviet Union, which he lost under Stalin.

September
5 September – The first AIDS case in the Soviet Union kills a 29-year-old woman Olga G.

October
1 October – Andrei Gromyko retires from the office of Chairman of the Presidium of the Supreme Soviet.
7 October – The Russian tricolor is raised openly for the first time in the Soviet Union during a demonstration in Leningrad.
3 October – OMON is created.
16 October – Escrava Isaura premieres in the Soviet Union on the Central Television.

November
12 November – Large-scale demonstrations and hunger strike began in Tbilisi, the capital of the Georgian SSR, against the Soviet policies.
15 November – Buran spacecraft makes its first and only flight.
18 November – The Soviet Union recognizes the State of Palestine, proclaimed three days earlier in Algiers by the Palestinian Liberation Organization.

December
1 December 
The Supreme Soviet of the Soviet Union adopts the laws "On the Election of People's Deputies" and "On Amendments and Additions to the Constitution of the USSR".
The hijacking of a LAZ-687 bus with schoolchildren takes place in Ordzhonikidze.
7 December 
 Spitak earthquake kills several thousands of people.
 Singing Revolution: Estonian language replaces Russian as the official language of the Estonian SSR.
30 December – The Central Committee of the Communist Party of the Soviet Union, Presidium of the Supreme Soviet and the Council of Ministers of the Soviet Union publish the decision to remove the names of Leonid Brezhnev and Konstantin Chernenko from the names of all institutions, streets and inhabited places.

Births
10 January – Vladimir Zharkov, Russian ice hockey player
15 January – Nataliia Mandryk, Ukrainian Paralympic wheelchair fencer
19 January – Alexey Vorobyov, Russian singer and actor
3 March – Valeriy Chybineyev, Ukrainian sniper (died 2022)
1 April – Alexander Bychkov, Russian serial killer
16 May – Martynas Gecevičius, Lithuanian basketball player
12 June – Artūrs Bērziņš, Latvian basketball player
2 August – Anton Makovich, Russian former professional football player
17 September – Pavel Mamayev, Russian footballer
20 September – Khabib Nurmagomedov, Russian professional mixed martial artist
19 October – Markiyan Kamysh, Ukrainian novelist
10 November – Natalia Pereverzeva, Russian model
20 November – Liis Lindmaa, Estonian actress

Deaths
11 February – Nikolai Sergeyev, Admiral of the Fleet (born 1909)
17 February – Alexander Bashlachev, singer-songwriter (born 1960)
13 May – Sergey Gorshkov, Admiral of the Fleet (born 1910)
31 August – Edgar Elbakyan, Armenian actor (born 1928)
1 October – Anatoly Blatov, diplomat (born 1914)

Unknown dates

Little Vera premieres in the Soviet Union.
Many higher education institutes cancel military training departments, which helped students to avoid military draft.

Footnotes

References

See also
1988 in fine arts of the Soviet Union
List of Soviet films of 1980-91

 
1980s in the Soviet Union
Years in the Soviet Union
Soviet Union
Soviet Union
Soviet Union